The South Carolina Hydrogen & Fuel Cell Alliance (SCHFCA) is a Public-private collaborative with a mission of advancing the commercialization of hydrogen fuel cell technologies in the state of South Carolina.  Government entities, in particular, the Department of Energy has funded SCHFCA with $188,788 for a hydrogen education program for state and local officials. State taxpayers have already chipped in $12.3 million for hydrogen fuel cell development, while other non-state entities like federal and private sources have invested nearly $115 million into the development of the technology.

Founding organizations 
SCHFCA was founded in 2006 by six core institutions that were devoted to Hydrogen & Fuel Cell initiatives and development. 
University of South Carolina 
Clemson University
Applied Research Center: Hydrogen
Savannah River National Laboratory
The South Carolina Department of Commerce
South Carolina State University.

Affiliate members 
SCRA
South Carolina Energy Office
EngenuitySC
Greenway Energy LLC
South Carolina Fire Marshal's Office
NSF Industry/University Cooperative Research Center for Fuel Cells
Palmetto State Clean Fuel Coalition
South Carolina Technical College System

See also 
National Hydrogen Association
United States Department of Energy
Savannah River Site

References

External links
Official website of the South Carolina Hydrogen & Fuel Cell Alliance
Official website of the South Carolina Department of Commerce
Official website of the Applied Research Center for Hydrogen

Hydrogen economy organizations
Hydrogen technologies
Organizations based in South Carolina